Naduparambil Pappachen Pradeep (born 28 April 1983), commonly known as NP Pradeep, is a retired Indian professional footballer who played as a defender. Pradeep hails from Moolamattom in Kerala. He was also the captain of India's U23 team. He is currently working as a Malayalam co-commentator and pundit on Star Sports network.

Club career

Pradeep used to play as a striker during his youth career and represented his state, Kerala, at Under-17 and Under-21 levels. At the age of 17 he signed for SBT and soon was transformed into a midfielder. He represented India at various age group levels, including the Under-20 team that reached the quarterfinals of the 2002 AFC Under-20 Championships. Pradeep continued to impress at SBT, helping them to win four Kerala League titles.

His first call up to the senior team was during the 2005 SAFF Cup in Bangladesh, which India went on to win. In 2006, Pradeep made his first big move at club level as he joined National League champions Mahindra United. There Pradeep developed a quality of being very versatile as he also at times played as a fullback. The man from Kerala also captained the India Under-20 side that reached the last eight of the 2006 AFC Challenge Cup.

He won the IFA Shield and reached the quarter-finals of the AFC Cup with Mahindra and caught the eye of newly appointed India coach Bob Houghton. Initially he was used as a left back by the English tactician but by the start of the 2007 Nehru Cup, Pradeep was in the India squad as a goal scoring midfielder. India's first goal in that competition was scored by the man from Kerala but his best moment came in the final. In 2016, he worked as a player scout for ISL side Kerala Blasters.

Viva Kerala FC
For the 2010–11 I-League season Pradeep signed with Viva Kerala and scored two goals in four games. He scored his third goal against Dempo for Viva on 8 April 2011.

Mohun Bagan AC
During the off season after the I-League 2010-11 season Pradeep signed for I-League club Mohun Bagan A.C.

Dodsal Football Club
The Indian international did not have a 2011–12 I-League season to remember as he was on the fringes of the first team at Mohun Bagan.
NP Pradeep signed for Dodsal F.C. in 2012, along with the likes of Surkumar Singh & Mohammed Rafi. It is also said that head coach Bimal Ghosh and his liking for the city of Mumbai were the two main reasons for him choosing to sign up with the 2nd-tier I-League side.

On 6 April 2013, he scored a 2nd-minute goal at Bangalore against Rangdajied United F.C., though the Tigers lost the match 1–3.

Mumbai FC
On 24 November 2013 it was announced that Pradeep has signed for Mumbai on loan from IMG RELIANCE with three other players Khelemba Singh, Mohammed Rafi and Peter Costa.
He made his debut on 2 December 2013 against East Bengal F.C. at the Balewadi Sports Complex in which he scored a goal in 65th minute and played till the 76th minutes before being replaced by Sandjar Ahmadi as Mumbai won the match 3–2.

International career
Pradeep is a regular on the India national t/eam. He plays as an attacking midfielder and has often scored scorching long rangers. He has played for India in the AFC Asia Cup 2007 qualifiers and scored a goal against Yemen. Pradeep has also represented India in the Vancouver Whitecaps Invitational in 2006 scoring a goal there as well. He played extremely well in India's exposure trip to Portugal in 2007 where they played Portuguese club sides.

His most memorable performance was perhaps in the Nehru Cup 2007 where he scored 2 stunning goals, including the goal in the finals versus Syria which won India the cup. Incidentally he opened and also closed the scoring in the Nehru Cup 2007.

Pradeep is remarked by critics as a player whose talents and skills can potentially surpass former Indian captain I. M. Vijayan.

Since then Pradeep has been a regular in the first eleven of the senior national team, helping them to win two more trophies. In the Asian Cup 2011 Pradeep played a vital defensive role for India. Despite his efforts India crashed out of the Asian Cup after three defeats in the group stage.

International goals
Scores and results list India's goal tally first.

Honours

India
 AFC Challenge Cup: 2008
 SAFF Championship: 2005; runner-up: 2008
 Nehru Cup: 2007, 2009

India U20
 South Asian Games Silver medal: 2004

Personal life
After retiring from football, Pradeep worked as a scout for Reliance Foundation Young Champs (RFYC).

References

External links
 Interview in Mohun Bagan Official Website
Pradeep's scorcher in the Nehru Cup 2007 final
India winning Nehru Cup
 

1983 births
Living people
Indian footballers
India international footballers
India youth international footballers
Footballers from Kerala
Malayali people
People from Idukki district
2011 AFC Asian Cup players
I-League players
Mohun Bagan AC players
Chirag United Club Kerala players
Mumbai Tigers FC players
Mumbai FC players
Sree Kerala Varma College alumni
Footballers at the 2006 Asian Games
Association football forwards
Association football midfielders
Asian Games competitors for India
Association football commentators
Indian sports broadcasters
Kerala Blasters FC non-playing staff
South Asian Games silver medalists for India
South Asian Games medalists in football